Schmalhausen may refer to:

 Ivan Ivanovich Schmalhausen, a Russian and Ukrainian zoologist and evolutionist
 Johannes Theodor Schmalhausen, a botanist known for his study of East European plants